The 2013 ICC World Cricket League Division Three was a cricket tournament which took place from 28 April to 5 May 2013 in Bermuda. It formed part of the ICC World Cricket League and qualifying for the 2015 World Cup.

Nepal were the pre-tournament favourites, but they lost against USA and Uganda in their first two matches. On the other hand, USA and Uganda made solid starts. Uganda remained unbeaten in their first four matches to comfortably secure one of the two available places in the 2014 World Cup Qualifier. 

In the fifth round of the league, three teams remained in contention for the second qualifying spot, USA having won 3 out of 4 and Bermuda & Nepal both having won 2 out of 4. USA could guarantee progress by defeating the hosts Bermuda, but for Nepal to proceed, they had to defeat Italy by a heavy margin and also rely on a Bermuda victory over the USA. In the end, exactly that happened and Nepal went through to the 2014 World Cup Qualifier over USA and hosts Bermuda on net run rate.

Teams
The teams that took part in the tournament were decided according to the results of the 2011 ICC World Cricket League Division Two, the 2011 ICC World Cricket League Division Three and the 2012 ICC World Cricket League Division Four.

Squads

Points table

Matches

Playoffs

5th place playoff

3rd place playoff

Final

Statistics

Most runs
The top five highest run scorers (total runs) in the season are included in this table.

Most wickets
The following table contains the five leading wicket-takers of the season.

Final Placings

After the conclusion of the tournament the teams were distributed as follows:

References

http://www.icc-cricket.com/newsdetails.php?newsId=23317_1366097760

2013 Division Three